Barilius ponticulus is a fish in genus Barilius of the family Cyprinidae. It is distributed in northern Thailand.

References 

P
Fish described in 1945